Bioenergetic systems are metabolic processes that relate to the flow of energy in living organisms. Those processes convert energy into adenosine triphosphate (ATP), which is the form suitable for muscular activity. There are two main forms of synthesis of ATP: aerobic, which uses oxygen from the bloodstream, and anaerobic, which does not. Bioenergetics is the field of biology that studies bioenergetic systems.

Overview
The cellular respiration process that converts the chemical energy of food into ATP (which can release energy) is largely dependent on oxygen availability. During exercise, the supply and demand of oxygen available to muscle cells is affected by duration and intensity and by the individual's cardiorespiratory fitness level. Three systems can be selectively recruited, depending on the amount of oxygen available, as part of the cellular respiration process to generate ATP for the muscles. They are ATP, the anaerobic system and the aerobic system.

Adenosine triphosphate
ATP is the usable form of chemical energy for muscular activity. It is stored in most cells, particularly in muscle cells. Other forms of chemical energy, such as those available from oxygen and food, must be transformed into ATP before they can be utilized by the muscle cells.

Coupled reactions
Since energy is released when ATP is broken down, energy is required to rebuild or resynthesize it. The building blocks of ATP synthesis are the by-products of its breakdown; adenosine diphosphate (ADP) and inorganic phosphate (Pi). The energy for ATP resynthesis comes from three different series of chemical reactions that take place within the body. Two of the three depend upon the food eaten, whereas the other depends upon a chemical compound called phosphocreatine. The energy released from any of these three series of reactions is utilized in reactions that resynthesize ATP. The separate reactions are functionally linked in such a way that the energy released by one is used by the other.

Three processes can synthesize ATP:
ATP–CP system (phosphagen system) – This system is used for up to 10 seconds. The ATP–CP system neither uses oxygen nor produces lactic acid if oxygen is unavailable and is thus called alactic anaerobic. This is the primary system behind very short, powerful movements like a golf swing, a 100 m sprint or powerlifting.
Anaerobic system – This system predominates in supplying energy for exercise lasting less than two minutes. It is also known as the glycolytic system. An example of an activity of the intensity and duration that this system works under would be a 400 m sprint.
Aerobic system – This is the long-duration energy system. After five minutes of exercise, the O2 system is dominant. In a 1 km run, this system is already providing approximately half the energy; in a marathon run it provides 98% or more.

Aerobic and anaerobic systems usually work concurrently. When describing activity, it is not a question of which energy system is working, but which predominates.

Aerobic and anaerobic metabolism
The term metabolism refers to the various series of chemical reactions that take place within the body. Aerobic refers to the presence of oxygen, whereas anaerobic means with a series of chemical reactions that does not require the presence of oxygen. The ATP-CP series and the lactic acid series are anaerobic, whereas the oxygen series is aerobic.

ATP–CP: the phosphagen system

Creatine phosphate (CP), like ATP, is stored in muscle cells. When it is broken down, a considerable amount of energy is released. The energy released is coupled to the energy requirement necessary for the resynthesis of ATP.

The total muscular stores of both ATP and CP are small. Thus, the amount of energy obtainable through this system is limited. The phosphagen stored in the working muscles is typically exhausted in seconds of vigorous activity. However, the usefulness of the ATP-CP system lies in the rapid availability of energy rather than quantity. This is important with respect to the kinds of physical activities that humans are capable of performing.

The Phosphagen System (ATP-PCr) occurs in the cytosol (a gel-like substance) of the sarcoplasm of skeletal muscle, and in the myocyte's cytosolic compartment of the cytoplasm of cardiac and smooth muscle.

During muscle contraction:

ATP → ADP + Pi (utilization of ATP for Muscle contraction by ATPase)

 ADP + CP → ATP + Creatine (catalyzed by creatine kinase, ATP is used again in the above reaction for continued muscle contraction)
 2 ADP → ATP + AMP (catalyzed by adenylate kinase/myokinase when CP is depleted, ATP is again used for muscle contraction)

 Muscle at rest:
 ATP + Creatine → ADP + CP (catalyzed by creatine kinase)
 ADP + Pi → ATP (during anaerobic glycolysis and oxidative phosphorylation)

When the Phosphagen System has been depleted of phosphocreatine (creatine phosphate), the resulting AMP produced from the adenylate kinase (myokinase) reaction is primarily regulated by the Purine Nucleotide Cycle.

Anaerobic system

This system is known as anaerobic glycolysis. "Glycolysis" refers to the breakdown of sugar. In this system, the breakdown of sugar supplies the necessary energy from which ATP is manufactured. When sugar is metabolized anaerobically, it is only partially broken down and one of the byproducts is lactic acid. This process creates enough energy to couple with the energy requirements to resynthesize ATP.

When H+ ions accumulate in the muscles causing the blood pH level to reach low levels, temporary muscle fatigue results. Another limitation of the lactic acid system that relates to its anaerobic quality is that only a few moles of ATP can be resynthesized from the breakdown of sugar. This system cannot be relied on for extended periods of time.

The lactic acid system, like the ATP-CP system, is important primarily because it provides a rapid supply of ATP energy. For example, exercises that are performed at maximum rates for between 1 and 3 minutes depend heavily upon the lactic acid system. In activities such as running 1500 meters or a mile, the lactic acid system is used predominantly for the "kick" at the end of the race.

Aerobic system

 Glycolysis – The first stage is known as glycolysis, which produces 2 ATP molecules, 2 reduced molecules of nicotinamide adenine dinucleotide (NADH) and 2 pyruvate molecules that move on to the next stage – the Krebs cycle. Glycolysis takes place in the cytoplasm of normal body cells, or the sarcoplasm of muscle cells.
 The Krebs cycle – This is the second stage, and the products of this stage of the aerobic system are a net production of one ATP, one carbon dioxide molecule, three reduced NAD+ molecules, and one reduced flavin adenine dinucleotide (FAD) molecule. (The molecules of NAD+ and FAD mentioned here are electron carriers, and if they are reduced, they have had one or two H+ ions and two electrons added to them.) The metabolites are for each turn of the Krebs cycle. The Krebs cycle turns twice for each six-carbon molecule of glucose that passes through the aerobic system – as two three-carbon pyruvate molecules enter the Krebs cycle. Before  pyruvate enters the Krebs cycle it must be converted to acetyl coenzyme A. During this link reaction, for each molecule of pyruvate converted to acetyl coenzyme A, a NAD+ is also reduced. This stage of the aerobic system takes place in the matrix of the cells' mitochondria.
 Oxidative phosphorylation – The last stage of the aerobic system produces the largest yield of ATP – a total of 34 ATP molecules. It is called oxidative phosphorylation because oxygen is the final acceptor of electrons and hydrogen ions (hence oxidative) and an extra phosphate is added to ADP to form ATP (hence phosphorylation).

This stage of the aerobic system occurs on the cristae (infoldings of the membrane of the mitochondria). The reaction of each NADH in this electron transport chain provides enough energy for 3 molecules of ATP, while reaction of FADH2 yields 2 molecules of ATP. This means that 10 total NADH molecules allow the regeneration of 30 ATP, and 2 FADH2 molecules allow for 4 ATP molecules to be regenerated (in total 34 ATP from oxidative phosphorylation, plus 4 from the previous two stages, producing a total of 38 ATP in the aerobic system). NADH and FADH2 are oxidized to allow the NAD+ and FAD to be reused in the aerobic system, while electrons and hydrogen ions are accepted by oxygen to produce water, a harmless byproduct.

References

Further reading
Exercise Physiology for Health, Fitness and Performance. Sharon Plowman and Denise Smith. Lippincott Williams & Wilkins; Third edition (2010). .

ATP metabolism